Léon Martin (30 April 1897 – 11 October 1956) was a Belgian racing cyclist. He rode in the 1927 Tour de France.

References

1897 births
1956 deaths
Belgian male cyclists
Place of birth missing